In toxicology, the margin of exposure (or MOE) of a substance is the ratio of its no-observed-adverse-effect level to its theoretical, predicted, or estimated dose or concentration of human intake. It is used in risk assessment to determine the dangerousness of substances that are both genotoxic and carcinogenic. This approach is preferred by both the World Health Organization and the European Food Safety Authority for the evaluation of the risk of carcinogens.

References

Toxicology